In music, a Flute method is a kind of specific textbook style manual for playing the flute. It usually contains fingering charts and/or scales and numerous different exercises, sometimes also simple etudes, in different keys, in ascending order as to difficulty (= in methodical progression) or with a focus on isolated aspects like fluency, rhythm, dynamics, articulation and the like. Sometimes there are duets or even recital pieces, also with accompaniment. Such methods differ from etude books in that they are meant as a linear course for a student to follow, with consistent guidance, whereas volumes of etudes are not as comprehensive.

As typical instrumental methods are meant to function as textbooks supporting an instrumental teacher (rather than to facilitate self-teaching), usually no basic or special playing techniques are covered in any depth. Detailed instructions in this respect are only found in special, autodidactical methods.

Some methods are specially tailored for students on certain skill levels or stages of psychosocial development. In contrast, a 'complete' method (sometimes in multiple volumes) is meant to accompany the student until he or she becomes an advanced player.

Methods of certain authors or editors have achieved the status of standard works (reflecting regional and cultural differences) and are published or reissued by different publishing companies and often in new layouts or arrangements. The Suzuki Method is one of the most well known examples of this.

The following is a list of various methods of historical interest.

Historical

17th Century
 Playford, John, The Delightful Companion or Choice new Lessons for The Recorder or Flute

18th Century
 Corrette, Michel, Méthode raisonnée pour apprendre aisément à jouër de la Flûtte Traversiere (1740)
 Hotteterre, Jacques, Principes de la flute traversiere, de la Flute a Bec, et du Haut-bois, Op.1 (Amsterdam: Estienne Roger, 1728)
 Lorenzoni, Antonio, Saggio per ben sonare il flautotraverso con alcune notizie generali ed utili per qualunque strumento, ed altre concernenti la storia della musica (Vicenza: Per F. Modena, 1779)
 Pearson, William, The Compleat Musick-Master (1722)
 Quantz, Johann Joachim, Versuch einer anweisung die flöte traversiere zu spielen. (1752)
Heron, Luke, A treatise on the German flute. (1771)
 Tromlitz, Johann George, Unterricht der flöte zu spielen (1791)

19th Century
 Altes, Henry, Method for the Boehm flute.
 Berbiguier, Benoit Tranquille, Flute method.
 Dressler, Rafael, New and complete instructions for the flute, Op. 68. (1827)
 Drouet, Louis, Method of flute playing. (1830)
 Fürstenau, Anton Bernhard, Flöten-schule, Op. 42. (1826)
 Fürstenau, Anton Bernhard, Die kunst des Flötenspiels, Op.138. (1844)
 Hugot and Wunderlich, Méthode de flûte. (1804)
 Lindsay, Thomas, The elements of flute-playing. (1830)
 Monzani, Tebaldo, Instructions for the german flute. (1801)
 Peraut, Mathieu, Méthode pour la flûte. (1800)
 Soussmann, Heinrich, Grosse praktische Flötenschule Op. 53 (Leipzig 1841)
 Wagner, Ernest, Foundation to flute playing.
 Wragg, Jacob, Improved_Flute_Preceptor... op. 6 (First Edition 1800?)

Modern Methods

Early 20th century
 De Lorenzo, Leonardo. L'Indispensabile – A complete modern school for the flute. (1912)
 Taffanel, Paul and Gaubert, Philippe. Methode complete de flute. (1923)

Mid to Late 20th Century
 Suzuki, Shinichi and Takahashi, Toshio The Suzuki Method for flute. (c.1972)

See also

 Method (music)
 Flute
 Western concert flute
 Suzuki method
 Music education

References

Side-blown flutes
Music education
Music textbooks